Patricia Ann Baird,  (born 11 October 1937)  is a British medical geneticist active in Canada. Her research has specialized on the relationship between medical technology and ethics.

Early life and education 
Patricia Baird was born in Littleborough, Lancashire, England, the daughter of Harold and Winifred Cainen Holt. She was educated at the Queen Mary School for Girls in Lytham, Lancashire. She emigrated to Canada at the age of 17 and was accepted to McGill University.  She received a Bachelor of Science degree in 1959 and a M.D., C.M. in 1963 from McGill University in Montreal.

Career and research 

She is a University Killam Distinguished Professor Emerita, Department of Medical Genetics at the University of British Columbia. In 1978, Baird became the head of the Department of Medical Genetics, leading the department to become an internationally renown research institution. She was the first woman to both be named as chair of a clinical medical department and to be elected to the Board of Governors at the University of British Columbia. In 1991, she became Vice-President of the Canadian Institute for Advanced Research. In 1989, she became the chair of the Royal Commission on New Reproductive Technologies.

Honours and awards
In 1992, Baird was recognized as a Member of the Order of British Columbia. In 2000, she was made an Officer of the Order of Canada in recognition for being "a contributor to science, public policy and the advancement of women". In 2001, Baird became a Fellow of the Royal Society of Canada.

She was presented the Cooper Ornithological Society Harry R. Painton Award in 2013, along with her co-authors Hope M. Draheim and Susan M. Haig, for their paper entitled “Temporal analysis of mtDNA variation reveals decreased genetic diversity in Least Terns” published in The Condor.

Selected publications 

 Baird, P. A., & MacDonald, E. C. (1981). An epidemiologic study of congenital malformations of the anterior abdominal wall in more than half a million consecutive live births. American Journal of Human Genetics.
 Spouge, D., & Baird, P. A. (1985). Hirschsprung disease in a large birth cohort. Teratology.
 Baird, P. A., Anderson, T. W., Newcombe, H. B., & Lowry, R. B. (1988). Genetic disorders in children and young adults: a population study. American Journal of Human Genetics.
 McIntosh, G. C., Olshan, A. F., & Baird, P. A. (1995). Paternal age and the risk of birth defects in offspring. Epidemiology.
 Baird, P. (2002). Identification of genetic susceptibility to common diseases: the case for regulation. Perspectives in Biology and Medicine.

Personal life 
She married Robert Merrifield Baird in 1964. Together, they had three children, Jennifer, Brian and Bruce Baird.

References 

1939 births
Living people
English geneticists
British expatriates in Canada
Fellows of the Royal Society of Canada
Members of the Order of British Columbia
McGill University Faculty of Medicine alumni
Officers of the Order of Canada
People from Lytham St Annes
Academic staff of the University of British Columbia
British women biologists
Women geneticists
English women scientists
Canadian women academics
20th-century Canadian women scientists
20th-century British women scientists
21st-century British women scientists
20th-century English women
20th-century English people
21st-century English women
21st-century English people
21st-century Canadian women scientists